Carex pansa is a species of sedge known by the common name sand dune sedge. It is native to coast of western North America from British Columbia to California, where it grows in dunes and other sandy habitat. This grasslike sedge produces sharply triangular stems up to about 40 centimeters tall from a network of thin, long, coarse rhizomes. The inflorescence is a cluster of several spikes of dark brownish flowers. The plant sometimes produces only male or female flowers in its inflorescences, but not both. This sedge is sometimes used as a grass substitute in local landscaping schemes.

References

External links
Jepson Manual Treatment
USDA Plants Profile
Flora of North America
Photo gallery

pansa
Flora of California
Plants described in 1888
Flora without expected TNC conservation status
Taxa named by Liberty Hyde Bailey
Flora of British Columbia
Flora of Oregon
Flora of Washington (state)